Air Commodore Ian Malcolm Bonham-Carter,  (31 July 1882 – 31 December 1953) was a senior officer in the Royal Air Force from the Bonham-Carter family. 

Bonham-Carter was the second son of Hugh Bonham-Carter, younger son of  John Bonham-Carter, and Jane Margaret Macdonald.

After his education at Haileybury, Bonham-Carter was commissioned into the Northumberland Fusiliers in 1900. He served in the 5th Battalion and then the 1st Battalion of the Northumberland Fusiliers before being appointed adjutant in 1909. In May 1914 he attended No. 6 Course at the Central Flying School, receiving his Aviator's Certificate no. 794 on 25 May. After completing his flying training, Bonham-Carter served in the Royal Flying Corps until he transferred to the Royal Air Force (RAF) on its creation in 1918.

In February 1922 Royal Air Force Ireland was reformed under the command of Group Captain Bonham-Carter. The life of this command was short, disbanding in 1923.

In 1925, Bonham-Carter was appointed Air Officer Commanding No. 3 Group and in 1926 he took up command of No. 23 Group. He was then posted in 1928 as Commandant of No. 1 School of Technical Training.

During the Second World War, Bonham-Carter served as Duty Air Commodore in the Operations Room of Headquarters RAF Fighter Command.

References

 

|-
 

 
|-

|-

1882 births
1953 deaths
Aviation pioneers
People educated at Haileybury and Imperial Service College
Royal Air Force officers
Royal Air Force personnel of World War I
Officers of the Order of the British Empire
Companions of the Order of the Bath
Royal Northumberland Fusiliers officers
Royal Air Force personnel of World War II
Ian
Military personnel from London